Henry IV of Brabant (1251/1252 – after 29 April 1272) was Duke of Brabant from 1261 to 1267.

Born at Leuven, he was the eldest son of Henry III, Duke of Brabant, and Adelaide of Burgundy.

Succeeding his father at about the age of ten, he proved infirm of mind and body, and was deposed in 1257 in favor of his younger brother John I, Duke of Brabant. After being deposed, Henry became a novice in Saint Bénigne Abbey in Dijon. It is unknown what happened to Henry after 1272.

References

1250s births
1270s deaths
Dukes of Brabant
House of Reginar
People from Leuven